Peperomia versteegii is a species of plant from the genus Peperomia. It grows in wet tropical biomes. It was discovered by Casimir de Candolle in 1910, in New Guinea.

Etymology
versteegii came from the Dutch physician "Gerard Versteeg".  had expeditions in Dutch New Guinea.

Distribution
Peperomia versteegii is endemic to New Guinea.

References

versteegii
Flora of New Guinea
Plants described in 1910
Taxa named by Casimir de Candolle